Krasne  is a village in Przasnysz County, Masovian Voivodeship, in east-central Poland. It is the seat of the gmina (administrative district) called Gmina Krasne.

During World War II, it was the seat of Erich Koch, the last Oberpräsident of East Prussia. It was situated in the Zichenau Region.

The village has a population of 1,000.

History 
Krasne is the ancestral nest of the Krasiński family of the Ślepowron coat of arms.

References

Villages in Przasnysz County